Spiritus: A Journal of Christian Spirituality is a biannual peer-reviewed academic journal published by Johns Hopkins University Press. It was established in 1993 as the Christian Spirituality Bulletin: Journal of the Society for the Study of Christian Spirituality and obtained its current title in 2001. It is the official publication of the Society for the Study of Christian Spirituality and covers research on Christian spirituality while fostering creative dialogue with non-Christian traditions. As such, it explores the relationship between spirituality and cultural analysis using the disciplines of history, philosophy, theology, and psychology, among others. The journal includes original articles, reviews, and translations. Readership includes academics as well as a general audience. The editor-in-chief is Steven Chase (Institute for the Study of Contemporary Spirituality, Oblate School of Theology).

Abstracting and indexing
The journal is abstracted and indexed in the Christian Periodical Index, Dietrich's Index Philosophicus, International Bibliography of Book Reviews of Scholarly Literature in the Humanities and Social Sciences, International Bibliography of Periodical Literature, and UDL-Edge Citation Index Database.

See also
 List of theology journals

References

External links

 Spiritus at Project MUSE
 Society for the Study of Christian Spirituality

Christianity studies journals
Publications established in 2001
Johns Hopkins University Press academic journals
Biannual journals
English-language journals
Religious studies journals